Kalpeni is an inhabited Atoll in the Union Territory of Lakshadweep, India. 

Geography

Kalpeni forms a single coral atoll along with the uninhabited islands of Cheriyam, Tilakkam, Kodithala and Pitti islet.

The eastern and southern shorelines of the island have accumulations of coral debris, the result of a violent storm that hit the area in 1847.

List of Islands
Cheriyam is the northernmost island, with a population of 10. It is the largest of Kalpeni's Satellite islands. The land in Cheriyam belongs to 49 families living in Kalpeni.MGNREGS is currently making an economic development on the island to accommodate a new village and resort like on Sentosa. It would impact the economic growth of Kalpeni Island.
Tilakkam group are a group of islands off the west of Kalpeni. The land of these islands  belong to two different families of Kalpeni:

Demographics
Kalpeni was the first island in the Union Territory where women were allowed to go to school and get an education.

Administration
The island belongs to the township of Kalpeni of Andrott Tehsil.

Tourism
Kalpeni has a beach at the northern tip of the island called Tip Beach where one can do snorkeling, sea bath and kayaking. Because of the coral reefs present in the sea near the beach, the water is shallow and calm, making it an excellent spot for beach activities.

There is a  lighthouse in Kalpeni from whose top one can see a bird's eye view of the island, the lagoon with the smaller islands, the reef and the surrounding ocean. From the top of the lighthouse, one can visualize the abundance of coconut trees and the ground is not visible due to dense packing of the tops of these trees.

Image gallery

References

External links 

Hydrographic Description (Indian Ocean Pilot)
Lagoon sizes
List of Atolls
An ornithological expedition to the Lakshadweep archipelago
Sources towards a history of the Laccadive Islands

Islands of Lakshadweep
Atolls of India
Cities and towns in Lakshadweep district
Islands of India
Populated places in India